The Fort Crittenden Formation is a geological formation in Arizona whose strata date back to the Late Cretaceous. Dinosaur remains are among the fossils that have been recovered from the formation.

Vertebrate paleofauna

Amphibians

Archosaurs

Bony fishes

Cartilaginous fishes

Lepidosaurs
Teiid and anguid lizards are known from the formation.

Turtles

See also

 List of dinosaur-bearing rock formations

Footnotes

References
 Sullivan, R.M., and Lucas, S.G. 2006. "The Kirtlandian land-vertebrate "age" – faunal composition, temporal position and biostratigraphic correlation in the nonmarine Upper Cretaceous of western North America." New Mexico Museum of Natural History and Science, Bulletin 35:7–29.
 Weishampel, David B.; Dodson, Peter; and Osmólska, Halszka (eds.): The Dinosauria, 2nd, Berkeley: University of California Press. 861 pp. .

Campanian Stage
Cretaceous Arizona